The Arnsberg Forest massacre (also known as the Massacre in Arnsberg Woods) was a series of mass extrajudicial killings of 208 forced labourers and POWs (Ostarbeiter), mainly of Russian and Polish descent, by Nazi troops under the command of Hans Kammler from 20 to 23 March 1945.

As of 2021, only 14 of the 208 victims have been identified.

First massacre 
The first killing occurred on 20 March in the Langenbach Valley, near Warstein, when 71 prisoners were marched by Hans Kammler's forces into the Arnsberg Forest, where they were instructed to hand over all their clothes and belongings and leave them on the side of the road. As they were led to a streamside escarpment, they were executed en masse via firing squad. The majority of the civilians were women; adult men only made up 10 of the total number of prisoners.

Excavation 
A study by archaeologists in 2019 found a number of different artifacts at the site where the victims were buried in a mass grave, including colourful buttons, shoes, and a Polish dictionary.

The archaeologists also found bullets scattered around the location, which suggested some of the prisoners tried to escape.

Second massacre 

In the second massacre, the Waffen-SS and the Wehrmacht made another group of 57 prisoners dig a zig-zagged series of trenches. Right after finishing the project, they were gunned down by the Nazi soldiers and thrown into the trenches, meant to be a mass grave.

Third massacre 
On 23 March, the Wehrmacht blew a deep hole in the ground near Eversberg using grenades. Eighty labourers were lined up in front of the hole and shot in a manner so their bodies would fall into the pit. The burial site was covered with a cow paddock.

Excavation 
In 2019, an archaeological study found 50 different artifacts at the site. While the Nazis had robbed most of their victims' possessions, they did leave behind materials they considered to be worthless, such as Soviet coins (indicating that many of the victims were Russian), a comb stand, and a harmonica.

Aftermath 

A few weeks after the massacres, the area around Arnsberg Forest was liberated by American troops, who discovered the first and second graves. The Americans heard about the killings from German informers. The soldiers, intending for the massacre to be revealed to the public, proceeded to organize the entire local German population (civilians and informers) to view the exhumation of the bodies.

The third site was not found until 1946, when the British military located it after being told by an informant. The grave's bodies were exhumed the next year and placed in the Fulmecke Cemetery in Meschede, which was also where the remains of the other massacres' victims were reburied.

In 2019, a major scientific study analyzing all three sites occurred, resulting in the discovery of over 400 different artifacts by the archaeologists.

References

External links 

 
1945 in Germany
Mass murder in 1945
20th century in North Rhine-Westphalia
Crime in North Rhine-Westphalia
March 1945 events in Europe
Massacres in 1945
Massacres in Germany
Nazi war crimes in Germany
Soviet World War II forced labourers
Polish prisoners of war in World War II
World War II prisoner of war massacres by Nazi Germany